In the mathematical field of general topology, a Dowker space is a topological space that is T4 but not countably paracompact. They are named after Clifford Hugh Dowker.

The non-trivial task of providing an example of a Dowker space (and therefore also proving their existence as mathematical objects) helped mathematicians better understand the nature and variety of topological spaces.

Equivalences
Dowker showed, in 1951, the following:

If X is a normal T1 space (that is, a T4 space), then the following are equivalent:
 X is a Dowker space
 The product of X with the unit interval is not normal.
 X is not countably metacompact.

Dowker conjectured that there were no Dowker spaces, and the conjecture was not resolved until Mary Ellen Rudin constructed one in 1971. Rudin's counterexample is a very large space (of cardinality ). Zoltán Balogh gave the first ZFC construction of a small (cardinality continuum) example, which was more well-behaved than Rudin's. Using PCF theory, M. Kojman and S. Shelah constructed a subspace of Rudin's Dowker space of cardinality  that is also Dowker.

References

Properties of topological spaces
Separation axioms